FOCUS (Families Overcoming Under Stress™) is a family-level resiliency training program designed to assist families experiencing high levels of stress and to prevent greater problems from occurring in the face of further stressors.

FOCUS is based on leading evidence-based family intervention models for at-risk families, and aims to strengthen family cohesion and parent-child, marital, and co-parenting relationships. FOCUS is structured around families’ development of a shared understanding of past experiences, as well as skill building in the areas of emotional regulation, communication, problem solving, goal setting, and managing trauma and loss reminders.

The core component of the FOCUS intervention is a six to eight session skills training program, with specific parent-only sessions, child-only sessions, and sessions including the whole family. When possible, both parents participate in the program; it can be conducted with one member participating long distance.

The FOCUS intervention has been adapted for use with a variety of populations experiencing family stressors and is utilized in an array of settings across the United States and in Japan.

FOCUS for Military Families, designed to address the stress of an increased operational tempo and multiple deployments on military families, is currently offered at 18 U.S. military sites. FOCUS offers several adaptations of the intervention, each of which uses the same core set of skills and the creation of a family narrative to assist military families facing challenges. FOCUS works with couples to increase their communication skills and understanding of each other’s experiences.  When working with families with kids ages 3 to 5, FOCUS focuses on bolstering parenting skills and building parents’ understanding of their child’s reactions to stressors. When working with combat injured soldiers and their families, the FOCUS intervention helps families adjust to the specific changes and challenges that accompany combat injury. Parts of the FOCUS curriculum are also utilized with the National Military Family Association’s Operation Purple Family Retreats, a program that provides four-day retreats to recently reunited military families.

In addition to its use with military families, FOCUS has been utilized in two Southern California Children’s Hospitals to address the needs of children and families facing a variety of types of trauma (e.g., severe illness, violence, or traumatic loss). FOCUS has also been used to help disaster relief workers and their families grow stronger in the face of some of the challenges they face.

References

Family